Alnashi (Alnaš) is a selo (larger village) in Alnashsky District, Udmurt Republic, Russia.

Its recorded history traces back to 1716. It was officially recognized as selo in 1836.

Notable people
Alexander Solovyov (politician),  head of Udmurtia (2014–2017) was born here

References

Rural localities in Udmurtia
Yelabuzhsky Uyezd